Parliamentary elections were held in Andorra on 1 March 2015. Despite losing five seats, the Democrats for Andorra retained their majority in the General Council, winning 15 of the 28 seats.

Electoral system
The 28 members of the General Council were elected by two methods; 14 members were elected in two-member constituencies based on the seven parishes, whilst the remaining 14 were elected in a single nationwide constituency by proportional representation, with seats allocated using the largest remainder method.

Opinion polls

Results
The Democrats for Andorra ran in alliance with United for Progress in Encamp, Communal Action of Ordino in Ordino, Massana Movement in La Massana, and the Coalition of Independents in Andorra la Vella. The Liberal Party ran in alliance with independent candidates in Encamp, Ordino and La Massana, and the Lauredian Union in Sant Julià de Lòria.

By parish

Notes

References

Parliamentary elections in Andorra
Andorra
General Council (Andorra)
2015 in Andorra
Andorra